Delgadillo is a surname. Notable people with the surname include:

Angel Delgadillo, the creator of the first Route 66 Association
Antonio Pérez Delgadillo (born 1978), Mexican football goalkeeper
Ceyli Delgadillo, voice actress who is from Arlington, Texas
Diego Delgadillo (born 1533), judge of the first Audiencia of New Spain
Fernando Delgadillo (born 1965), Latin American musician and composer
Jenaro Sánchez Delgadillo (1886–1927), Mexican martyr who died in the Cristero War
Juan Delgadillo (disambiguation), the first owner of the historic eatery Delgadillo's Snow Cap Drive-In
Nicolás Delgadillo (born 1997), Argentine footballer
Robert A. Delgadillo (Born 1971), also known as RAD, an artist whose work explores and celebrates pop culture
Rocky Delgadillo (born 1960), the current City Attorney of Los Angeles, California